Check-in or check in may refer to:

 Check-in - the process of announcing one's arrival at a hotel, airport, sea port or social network service
 Check In - an album by The Chalets
 Checking In - an American sitcom (1981).
 In revision control, putting a file under configuration control, or to write changes to a repository and allow others to use a file
 Core Protocols Check-in - protocol for sharing your current emotional states with others

See also 
 Checkout (disambiguation)